Taftan-e Jonubi Rural District is a rural district (dehestan) in Nukabad District, Khash County, Sistan and Baluchestan province, Iran. At the 2006 census, its population was 9,351, in 1,974 families.  The rural district has 62 villages.

References 

Rural Districts of Sistan and Baluchestan Province
Khash County